Hadrobregmus quadrulus is a species in the family Ptinidae ("death-watch and spider beetles"), in the order Coleoptera ("beetles").
Hadrobregmus quadrulus is found in North America.

References

Further reading
 American Beetles, Volume II: Polyphaga: Scarabaeoidea through Curculionoidea, Arnett, R.H. Jr., M. C. Thomas, P. E. Skelley and J. H. Frank. (eds.). 2002. CRC Press LLC, Boca Raton, FL.
 
 LeConte, J. L. (1859). Catalogue of the Coleoptera of Fort Tejon, California. Proceedings of the Academy of Natural Sciences of Philadelphia, vol. 11, 69–90.
 Peterson Field Guides: Beetles, Richard E. White. 1983. Houghton Mifflin Company.
 White, Richard E. (1982). A catalog of the Coleoptera of America north of Mexico. Family: Anobiidae. US Department of Agriculture, Agriculture Handbook, 529–570.

Anobiinae
Beetles described in 1859